Paraurantiacibacter namhicola is a Gram-negative, aerobic and non-motile bacterium from the genus Paraurantiacibacter which has been isolated from seawater from the South Sea in Korea.

References

External links
Type strain of Altererythrobacter namhicola at BacDive -  the Bacterial Diversity Metadatabase

Sphingomonadales
Bacteria described in 2011